Radical 13 or radical down box, meaning upside-down box or wide, is one of 23 of the 214 Kangxi radicals that are composed of 2 strokes.

In the Kangxi Dictionary, there are 50 characters (out of 49,030) to be found under this radical.

 is also the 10th indexing component in the Table of Indexing Chinese Character Components predominantly adopted by Simplified Chinese dictionaries published in mainland China.

Evolution

Derived characters

Literature 

Leyi Li: “Tracing the Roots of Chinese Characters: 500 Cases”. Beijing 1993, 
 KangXi:  page 128, character 30
 Dai Kanwa Jiten: character 1506
 Dae Jaweon: page 289, character 9
 Hanyu Da Zidian: volume 1, page 96, character 13

External links

Unihan data for U+5182

013
010